The 24 June 2004 Mosul bombings were a series of coordinated car bomb attacks in the northern Iraqi city of Mosul, where five car bombs targeted police stations and a city hospital killing at least 62 and injuring at least 220 people, many of them Iraqi policemen.

External links

Multiple attacks kill 100 in Iraq – BBC News

2004 murders in Iraq
21st-century mass murder in Iraq
Mass murder in 2004
Car and truck bombings in Iraq
Terrorist incidents in Iraq in 2004
History of Mosul
June 2004 events in Iraq